Alexander C. McCubbin (born 1886) was a professional footballer who played for Morton, Bristol Rovers, Huddersfield Town and Lincoln City.

References
 

1886 births
Year of death missing
Scottish footballers
Footballers from Greenock
Association football inside forwards
Southern Football League players
English Football League players
Scottish Football League players
Greenock Morton F.C. players
Bristol Rovers F.C. players
Huddersfield Town A.F.C. players
Lincoln City F.C. players